The Sán Dìu (also known as San Deo, Trai, Trai Dat and Man Quan Coc; ;; Vietnamese alphabet: Người Sán Dìu) are a Yao ethnic group in northern Vietnam who speak Yue Chinese (Cantonese), a Sinitic language. They are believed to have migrated from Guangdong, China around 1600.

The group's estimated population as of 2000 was 117,500; the 2019 census put the number at 183,004. They speak a variant of Cantonese, and it is suggested that some still speak Iu Mien. The major religions are Mahayana Buddhism and Taoism, with elements of animism and veneration of the dead.  About 400 are adherents of the Catholic Church; a few are evangelical Protestants. This ethnic group is mainly concentrated in Thái Nguyên Province.

See also
 List of ethnic groups in Vietnam
 Hoa people
 Ngái people

References

Ma Khánh Bằng (1975). "Về ý thức tự giác dân tộc của người Sán Dìu". In, Ủy ban khoa học xã hội Việt Nam: Viện dân tộc học. Về vấn đề xác định thánh phần các dân tộc thiểu số ở miền bắc Việt Nam, 365–376. Hà Nội: Nhà xuất bản khoa học xã hội.
Ngô Văn Trụ; Nguyễn Xuân Cần. 2003. Dân tộc Sán Dìu ở Bắc Giang. Hanoi: Nhà xuất bản văn hóa dân tộc.
Ngô Văn Trụ; Nguyễn Xuân Cần. 2012. Dân tộc Sán Dìu ở Bắc Giang. Hanoi: Nhà xuất bản thời đại.

External links
San Diu of Vietnam

Chinese diaspora in Asia
Ethnic groups in Vietnam
Guangdong